Fiji is served by a number of trade unions, many of them affiliated with the Fiji Trades Union Congress. The Congress was founded in 1952. In 2008, 32,000 Fijians were members of a union affiliated with the Congress. Another 8,000 workers are members of a union affiliated with the Fiji Islands Council of Trade Unions

Trade unions
National Farmers Union of Fiji
Fiji Public Service Association
Fiji Teachers Union
Fiji Sugar & General Workers Union
National Union of Hospitality, Catering & Tourism Industries Employees
National Union of Factory and Commercial Workers Union